Ready for This is an Australian teen-oriented television drama series that premiered on ABC3 on 5 October 2015. It follows five Indigenous teenagers who venture across the country to Sydney to pursue their dreams.

Cast
Majeda Beatty as Ava Ban
Christian Byers as Reece Scott
Madeleine Madden as Zoe Preston
Aaron L. McGrath as Levi Mackay
Liam Talty as Dylan Brockman
Leonie Whyman as Lily Carney
Lasarus Ratuere as Mick
Christine Anu as Vee

Production
The 14-part series is written by Liz Doran, Jon Bell, Guila Sandler, Josh Mapleston, Kristen Dunphy, Kirsty Fisher, Leah Purcell, Steven McGregor and Greg Waters. A joint venture between Werner Film Productions and Blackfella Films, it was produced by Big Chance Films for the ABC, in association with Screen Australia and Screen NSW, with international sales by the Australian Children's Television Foundation (ACTF). The series is produced by Joanna Werner and Miranda Dear and executive produced by Joanna Werner, Darren Dale, ABC's commissioning editor Simon Hopkinson and the ACTF's Bernadette O'Mahony.

Executive producer Darren Dale said: "A concept forged through mutual admiration and respect, Werner Film Productions and Blackfella Films are delighted to be producing Ready For This for the ABC through our joint venture Big Chance Films. This aspirational series highlights the challenges and adventures of elite teens brought together in pursuit of their dreams.

"Ready For This is the collaboration of two exceptional Australian producers and we're thrilled to bring this landmark new drama to our ABC3 audience. After the success of Dance Academy and Nowhere Boys, our audience is ready to be captivated by these exciting new characters and storylines," said ABC TV’s Head of Children's Television, Deirdre Brennan.

Episodes

Awards

References

External links 

Australian Broadcasting Corporation original programming
2015 Australian television series debuts
Australian children's television series
Australian drama television series
English-language television shows
2010s teen drama television series
Television series about teenagers
Television shows set in Sydney
Indigenous Australian television series